Linzagolix, sold under the brand name Yselty, is a medication used in the treatment of uterine fibroids. Linzagolix is a small-molecule, non-peptide, orally active gonadotropin-releasing hormone antagonist (GnRH antagonist) developed by Kissei Pharmaceutical and ObsEva.

In June 2022, it was approved for medical use in the European Union and in the United Kingdom.

Medical uses
Linzagolix is indicated for treatment of moderate to severe symptoms of uterine fibroids in adult women of reproductive age.

Available forms
Linzagolix is available as linzagolix choline, the choline salt of linzagolix, in the form of 100 and 200mg film-coated oral tablets.

Pharmacology

Pharmacodynamics
Linzagolix acts as a selective antagonist of the GnRH receptor, the biological target of GnRH. By blocking this receptor, linzagolix prevents GnRH-mediated secretion of the gonadotropins, luteinizing hormone (LH) and follicle-stimulating hormone (FSH), and prevents them from signaling the gonads to produce sex hormones including estrogens, progesterone, and androgens.

In clinical studies, linzagolix fully suppressed estradiol levels (median <20pg/mL) in women at a dosage of 200mg/day, whereas partial suppression of estradiol levels (median 20–60pg/mL) occurred at a dosage 100mg/day. Progesterone levels were also variably suppressed with these dosages.

Pharmacokinetics
The elimination half-life of linzagolix with repeated administration is approximately 15hours.

Society and culture

Legal status 
On 16 December 2021, and on 22 April 2022, the Committee for Medicinal Products for Human Use (CHMP) of the European Medicines Agency (EMA) adopted a positive opinion, recommending the granting of a marketing authorization for the medicinal product Yselty, intended for the treatment of symptoms of uterine fibroids. The applicant for this medicinal product is ObsEva Ireland Ltd. Linzagolix was approved for medical use in the European Union in June 2022.

Brand names
Linzagolix is sold under the brand name Yselty.

Availability
Linzagolix is available in the European Union and in the United Kingdom.

References

Further reading

External links
 
 

Carboxylic acids
Ethers
Fluoroarenes
GnRH antagonists
Pyrimidines